Plakobranchus is a genus of sea slugs, sacoglossans, marine opisthobranch gastropod mollusks in the family Plakobranchidae.

The author of the genus spelled the name originally as Plakobranchus, but the spelling  Placobranchus was a long time the prevailing usage, based on an incorrect subsequent spelling by Férussac (1824) in a translation of van Hasselt's work.

Species 
Species within the genus Plakobranchus include:
 Plakobranchus noctisstellatus Mehrotra, Caballer, C.M. Scott, Arnold, Monchanin & Chavanich, 2020
 Plakobranchus ocellatus van Hasselt, 1824
 Plakobranchus papua Meyers-Muñoz & van der Velde, 2016

Recent work on the photosynthetic abilities of Plakobranchus reveals that P. ocellatus is actually a species complex.

Synonyms
 Plakobranchus argus Bergh, 1872: synonym of Plakobranchus ocellatus van Hasselt, 1824
 Plakobranchus camiguinus Bergh, 1872: synonym of Plakobranchus ocellatus van Hasselt, 1824
 Plakobranchus chlorophacus Bergh, 1873: synonym of Plakobranchus ocellatus van Hasselt, 1824
 Plakobranchus guttatus Stimpson, 1855: synonym of Plakobranchus ocellatus van Hasselt, 1824
 Plakobranchus ianthobaptus Gould, 1852: synonym of Plakobranchus ocellatus van Hasselt, 1824
 Plakobranchus laetus Bergh, 1872: synonym of Plakobranchus ocellatus van Hasselt, 1824
 Plakobranchus moebii Bergh, 1888: synonym of Thuridilla moebii (Bergh, 1888) (original combination)
 Plakobranchus priapinus Bergh, 1872: synonym of Plakobranchus ocellatus van Hasselt, 1824
 Plakobranchus punctulatus Bergh, 1872: synonym of Plakobranchus ocellatus van Hasselt, 1824
 Plakobranchus virgata Bergh, 1888: synonym of Thuridilla virgata (Bergh, 1888) (original combination)

References 

 Trowbridge C.D., Hirano Y.M. & Hirano Y.J. (2011) Inventory of Japanese sacoglossan opisthobranchs: Historical review, current records, and unresolved issues. American Malacological Bulletin 29: 1-22.

External links
 Meyers-Muñoz M.A., van der Velde G., van der Meij S.E.T., Stoffels B.E.M.W., van Alen T., Tuti Y. & Hoeksema B.W. (2016). The phylogenetic position of a new species of Plakobranchus from West Papua, Indonesia (Mollusca, Opisthobranchia, Sacoglossa). ZooKeys. 594: 73-98.

Plakobranchidae